Melanocoryphus is a genus of seed bugs in the family Lygaeidae. There are about eight described species in Melanocoryphus.

Species
These species belong to the genus Melanocoryphus:
 Melanocoryphus albomaculatus Goeze, 1778
 Melanocoryphus buettikeri Hamid & Hamid, 1985
 Melanocoryphus exutus Horvath, 1916
 Melanocoryphus japonicus (Walker, 1872)
 Melanocoryphus kerzhneri Josifov, 1965
 Melanocoryphus melanospiloides (Montandon, 1893)
 Melanocoryphus parvipennis Horvath, 1916
 Melanocoryphus tristrami (Douglas & Scott, 1868)

References

Further reading

External links

 

Lygaeidae